James Edward Arnold (born January 31, 1961) is a former American college and professional football player who was a punter in the National Football League (NFL) for 12 seasons during the 1980s and 1990s.  Arnold played college football for Vanderbilt University, and earned All-American honors.  He played professionally for the Kansas City Chiefs, Detroit Lions, and Miami Dolphins of the NFL, and was a Pro Bowl selection twice.

Arnold was born in Dalton, Georgia.

External links
NFL.com player page

References

1961 births
Living people
All-American college football players
American football punters
Detroit Lions players
Kansas City Chiefs players
Miami Dolphins players
National Conference Pro Bowl players
People from Dalton, Georgia
Vanderbilt Commodores football players